Uncaged was a special episode of Impact! produced by Impact Wrestling, which was taped on January 11 and January 12, 2019 at the Frontón México in Mexico City, Mexico and it aired on February 15, 2019.

Four professional wrestling matches were contested at the event. The main event was a four-way match for the Impact World Championship, in which Johnny Impact retained the title against Brian Cage, Killer Kross and Moose. On the undercard, Taya Valkyrie retained the Impact Knockouts Championship against Tessa Blanchard in a street fight and Lucha Libre AAA Worldwide representatives Aero Star, El Hijo del Vikingo, Psycho Clown and Puma King defeated Impact Wrestling representatives Eddie Edwards, Eli Drake, Fallah Bahh and Sami Callihan in an eight-man elimination tag team match to win the World Cup.

Event

Preliminary matches
The event kicked off with a street fight, in which Taya Valkyrie defended the Knockouts Championship against Tessa Blanchard. Valkyrie knocked out Blanchard with a diving double foot stomp through a table to retain the title.

Next, Willie Mack took on Ethan Page. Mack nailed Page with a stunner for the win.

Sami Callihan then offered Rich Swann, a spot in his group oVe but Swann refused which led to Callihan and Swann brawling with each other and the brawl ended with Callihan delivering a piledriver to Swann through the stage to knock him out. Callihan would then participate in an eight-man elimination tag team match to represent Impact Wrestling alongside Eddie Edwards, Eli Drake and Fallah Bahh against Lucha Libre AAA Worldwide representatives Aero Star, El Hijo del Vikingo, Psycho Clown and Puma King for the World Cup. The first elimination occurred when Edwards prevented Drake from using Edwards' "Kenny" on King, allowing King to roll up Drake. Vikingo dived onto Bahh but Bahh countered by powerslamming him to eliminate him. Bahh then tried to nail a Banzai Drop to Aero Star but Aero Star avoided it and pinned Bahh with a crucifix to eliminate him. Edwards then nailed a Boston Knee Party to Aero Star to eliminate him. The match progressed as Callihan executed a Cactus Special to King to eliminate him. Edwards then nailed a Boston Knee Party to Clown but Callihan pushed him, allowing Clown to roll him up for the elimination. Edwards and Psycho Clown were the remaining two participants. Eli Drake interfered by hitting Edwards with a kendo stick and Clown hit a double knee backbreaker to Edwards and pinned him with a La magistral for the win.

Main event match
The main event was a four-way match for the Impact World Championship, in which Johnny Impact defended the title against Brian Cage, Killer Kross and Moose. Impact first nailed Moose with a Countdown to Impact and Cage then delivered a Drill Claw to Kross and both men simultaneously got the pinfalls but Impact was awarded the victory due to executing his finisher first.

Results

References

Impact Wrestling shows
2019 in professional wrestling
January 2019 sports events in Mexico
Professional wrestling in Mexico
2019 in Mexico
2019 American television episodes
2010s American television specials
Events in Mexico City